Akhteh Chi (also Romanized as Akhteh Chī and Akhtehchī) is a village in Talarpey Rural District, in the Central District of Simorgh County, Mazandaran Province, Iran. At the 2006 census, its population was 445, in 116 families.

References 

Populated places in Simorgh County